A settler is a person who has migrated, who takes up residence on land and cultivates it, as opposed to a nomad.

Settler or settlers  may also refer to:

Books
The Settlers (novel), a Swedish novel by Vilhelm Moberg
The Settlers, Canadian novel, published in 1844 by Frederick Marryat 
The Settlers, an American novel set in Palestine, by Meyer Levin in 1972
Settlers: The Mythology of the White Proletariat, 1983 Maoism–Third Worldism book by J. Sakai

Film and TV
The Settlers (film), a documentary by Shimon Dotan (2016)
Settlers (film), a 2021 film by Wyatt Rockefeller

Games
The Settlers of Catan, a German board game
The Settlers (video game series), a video game series
The Settlers (1993 video game), the first game in the series
The Settlers DS, a Nintendo DS video game
The Settlers HD, a portable video game
The Settlers (2020 video game), an upcoming video game

Music
The Settlers (band), a British folk band of the 1960s and early 70s

Other
Sporting Life SETTLER, an electronic betting calculator designed by Sinclair
Israeli settlers, civilians who moved to lands occupied by Israel in the 1967 Six-Day War

See also
Settler Swahili, a Swahili pidgin
Charles Carroll the Settler (1661–1720), lawyer and planter in colonial Maryland
Settling, the process where particulates settle to the bottom of a liquid